John Sylvester Laybourne (26 May 1927 – 1 July 1980) was an English footballer who represented Great Britain at the 1956 Summer Olympics. He played as an amateur for Corinthian-Casuals.

References

1927 births
1980 deaths
English footballers
Corinthian-Casuals F.C. players
Footballers at the 1956 Summer Olympics
Olympic footballers of Great Britain
Association footballers not categorized by position